Ronojoy "Rono" Dutta is an Indian aviation executive. He is currently the CEO of InterGlobe Aviation Limited which operates IndiGo. He served as the President of the United Airlines from 1999 to 2002.

Career 
Dutta is the co-founder, managing director, member of management committee, and member of investment committee at Achuthan & Co. L.L.C. Prior to working here, Dutta was a partner at the firm and also a strategic advisor of AAR Corp. With over 25 years of experience, in the aviation industry, Dutta has a lot to offer.

He served as the senior vice-president, planning and revenue management at the United Airlines from 1995 to 1999. He was then promoted to the president of the United and served till 2002.

He became the chairman of the Air Sahara in July 2004. He was then additionally made the president of Sahara Air Limited in 2006. He worked for Sahara till 2008. Under him the sales grew at 35 percent a year.

In 2007, Dutta joined US-based AAR Corporation as a strategic adviser for the Indian market.

On 24 January 2019, he took the role of CEO, InterGlobe Aviation Limited.

Organizations 
 Member of board of trustees of Ravinia Festival in Chicago.

Education 
Dutta studied in St. Edmund's School, Shillong and obtained his degrees from the IIT Kharagpur and Harvard Business School.

References

External links 
 
 

Year of birth missing (living people)
Living people
American people of Indian descent
United Airlines people
IIT Kharagpur alumni
Harvard Business School alumni
Indian emigrants to the United States
People associated with Shillong